Manče is a village in the upper Vipava Valley in the Municipality of Vipava in the Littoral region of Slovenia.

Church
A small church built above the village in the 1990s was dedicated to Saint Martin in 2000 and is privately owned.

Notable people
Notable people that were born or lived in Manče include:
Marko Natlačen (1886–1942), politician

References

External links

Manče at Geopedia

Populated places in the Municipality of Vipava